Alfred Hemmann (13 October 1895 – 26 September 1957) was a German general in the Wehrmacht during World War II. He was a recipient of the Knight's Cross of the Iron Cross of Nazi Germany. Hemmann surrendered to Soviet forces in May 1945 in the Courland Pocket; he was released in 1955.

Awards and decorations

 Knight's Cross of the Iron Cross on 21 August 1941 as Oberstleutnant and commander of Infanterie-Regiment 426

References

Citations

Bibliography

1895 births
1957 deaths
German Army personnel of World War I
German prisoners of war in World War II held by the Soviet Union
Lieutenant generals of the German Army (Wehrmacht)
People from Gliwice
People from the Province of Silesia
Recipients of the clasp to the Iron Cross, 2nd class
Recipients of the Knight's Cross of the Iron Cross